Zajčji Vrh pri Stopičah (in older sources also Zajč Vrh) is a settlement in the foothills of the Gorjanci range in the City Municipality of Novo Mesto in southeastern Slovenia. The area is part of the traditional region of Lower Carniola and is now included in the Southeast Slovenia Statistical Region.

Name
The name of the settlement was changed from Zajčji Vrh to Zajčji Vrh pri Stopičah in 1955.

Church
The local church is dedicated to Saint Matthias and belongs to the Parish of Stopiče. It was built in the late 17th century.

References

External links
Zajčji Vrh pri Stopičah on Geopedia

Populated places in the City Municipality of Novo Mesto